The 1954 Mille Miglia (officially XXI Mille Miglia ), was a motor race open to Sports Cars, GT cars and Touring Cars. It was the 21st Mille Miglia and the third race of the 1954 World Sportscar Championship. The race was held on the public roads of Italy on 2 May 1954 using a route based on a round trip between Brescia and Rome, with the start and finish in Brescia. It was won by Alberto Ascari driving a Lancia D24.

As in previous year, the event is not strictly a race against each other, as is a race against the clock. The cars are released at one-minute intervals with the larger professional class cars going before the slower cars, in the Mille Miglia, however the smaller displacement slower cars started first. Each car number related to their allocated start time. For example, Giuseppe Farina’s car had the number 606, he left Brescia at 6:06am, while the first cars had started late in the evening on the previous day.

The previous August, Italian racing legend Tazio Nuvolari died. As a mark of respect, the route of this race was changed to divert through Mantua, where he was a resident.

Report

Entry
A total of 483 cars were entered for the event, across nine classes based on engine sizes, ranging from up to 750cc to over 2.0 litre, for Grand Touring Cars, Touring Cars and Sport Cars. Of these, 378 cars started the event.

Fresh from their loss in Florida at the 12 Hours of Sebring, Lancia entered in force with four newly revised D24 cars, these were piloted by Piero Taruffi, Alberto Ascari, Eugenio Castellotti and Gino Valenzano. The cars were modified by race car designer Vittorio Jano. These enhancements featured an enlarge version of their V6 engine, so that could produce 265 bhp.

Ferrari for their part arrived with four 300 bhp 4.9 litre, Ferrari 375 Plus’s for Giuseppe Farina, Umberto Maglioli, Giannino Marzotto and his brother Paolo Marzotto.  For 1954, the Mille Miglia was a round of the World Sports Car Championship; the home teams faced strong challengers. From Great Britain, came Aston Martin and Austin-Healey, and West Germany sent Porsches.

Also amongst the entry was the four-time winner, Clemente Biondetti, but by the time of the race, he was very sick man, fighting cancer, and only had a few months left to live.

Race

The race started at 21:01 on 1 May, when Domenico Stragliotto and Adolfo Montorio departed Brescia in their Iso Isetta. The faster cars would leave the following morning, when conditions were foggy mixed with little rain. After nine and half hours, all the cars were on their way to Rome.
 
The Lancias took the early lead, with Taruffi's D24 controlling the pace, averaging 108.9 mph, on the opening stages into Ravenna, with a lead of 90 seconds, over Ascari and Castellotti. The Ferrari of Maglioli was back in fourth. On the run into Rome, the Lancia of Castellotti developed distributor problems, and was forced into retirement, moving Maglioli into third. Further trouble hit the Lancia of Taruffi, when his sprung an oil leak and he soon retired. Ascari had taken it easy in the early stages, now assumed the lead.

On the run back to Brescia, Ascari's Lancia suffered a throttle spring return failure, and this was temporarily replaced by a rubber band. This and other problems started to affect the Lancia and by the time Ascari reached Florence, he had enough and wanted to retire from the event. It was only after a long stop for repairs, he was persuaded to continue. By Bologna, all the top Scuderia Ferrari cars were out, and the path was clear for Ascari to win.

For Ferrari, they had not lost a Mille Miglia since 1947, but this they were sounded thrashed by the team from Torino, with Ascari, winning in a time of 11hr 26:10mins., averaging a speed of 72.80 mph. 33:51mins adrift in second place was Ferrari 500 Mondial of Vittorio Marzotto, who salvaged some honour for Maranello marque with second place and a class win. The third different car on the podium was the Maserati of Musso. Another Ferrari came home in fourth, driven by Biondetti, in what was to be his last Mille Miglia; he was lifted exhausted from the car at the finish.

With the British attack failing to make it back to Brescia, it was left to the Germans to provide some opposition to the Italian teams. Encountering a lowered gate at a railway crossing, the Porsche driver, Hans Herrmann drove his low 550 Spyder under it, narrowly missing an express train. This daring act gave Porsche a first in class and an amazing sixth overall.

The event was marred by fatal accidents which killed 5 people and injured 13. Andre Pouschol and co-driver Gabriel Saisse were both killed and eight spectators injured when his Citroën 15 Six crashed into a signpost near Vicenza 75 miles into the race. The second accident saw navigator Silvio Dal Cin lose his life when his driver Ferdinando Mancini crashed his Maserati A6GCS after crossing the finish line. While other competitors were still arriving, Mancini left the course area at speed, waving hands and greeting the crowd. Shortly later, for unknown reasons Mancini lost control of the Maserati and crashed, passing in a long straight towards Ghedi, a neighbourhood of Brescia. During the crash Dal Cin was thrown out and received fatal skull fractures, and on top of this the crashing Maserati also hit an unnamed bystander and killed him instantly. Another accident involving a Renault 4CV of Jean Bianchi-Jean Sigrand at the village of Alfonsine near Ravenna. 15-year old spectator Settimio Caroli was killed and 2 other spectators injured after the Renault went off the road and crashed; Bianchi and Sigrand were both unhurt. There was a spectating woman who was also killed during the race in unknown circumstances.

Classification

Mille Miglia

Of the 378 starters, 182 were classified as finishers. Therefore, only a selection of notably racers has been listed below.

Class Winners are in Bold text.

Class Winners

Standings after the race

Note: Only the top five positions are included in this set of standings.Championship points were awarded for the first six places in each race in the order of 8-6-4-3-2-1. Manufacturers were only awarded points for their highest finishing car with no points awarded for positions filled by additional cars. Only the best 4 results out of the 6 races could be retained by each manufacturer.

References

Further reading

Anthony Pritchard. The Mille Miglia: The World’s Greatest Road Race. J H Haynes & Co Ltd. 
Leonardo Acerbi. Mille Miglia Story 1927-1957. Giorgio Nada Editore. 

Mille Miglia
Mille Miglia